Serhii Vladimirovich Andreev (born 14 March 1990) is a Ukrainian footballer who last plays as a centre-back for Terengganu II.

References

External links
 

1990 births
Living people
People from Lysychansk
Association football defenders
Ukrainian footballers
Terengganu F.C. II players
FC Krymteplytsia Molodizhne players
FC Shakhtar Sverdlovsk players
FC Nyva Ternopil players
FC Enerhiya Nova Kakhovka players
FC Arsenal-Kyivshchyna Bila Tserkva players
FC Podillya Khmelnytskyi players
FC Prykarpattia Ivano-Frankivsk (2004) players